The Constitution State Rivalry is the name of the college football rivalry between the Central Connecticut Blue Devils and the Sacred Heart Pioneers. Both schools are members of the Northeast Conference. The two schools are located 50 miles apart from each other in Connecticut. The two teams have met 23 times on the football field, with Central Connecticut currently holding a 13–10 edge in the all-time series.

Game results

See also  
 List of NCAA college football rivalry games

References

College football rivalries in the United States
Central Connecticut Blue Devils football
Sacred Heart Pioneers football
1998 establishments in Connecticut